Peter Ivan Lodtz Bastiansen (20 September 1912 – 13 April 1995) was a Norwegian businessperson and politician for the Communist Party.

He was born in Vadsø, and was the son of priest Alf Bjørnskau Bastiansen and brother of chemist Otto Bastiansen. After World War II he was a member of the central committee of the Norwegian Communist Party. He represented his party in Oslo city council from 1945 to 1948. In 1948 he relocated to Venezuela, and helped build the corporation Savoy Brands, one of the largest in the Venezuelan food industry.

References

1912 births
1995 deaths
People from Vadsø
20th-century Norwegian businesspeople
Norwegian communists
Communist Party of Norway politicians
Norwegian resistance members
Politicians from Oslo
Norwegian emigrants to Venezuela
Naturalized citizens of Venezuela
20th-century Venezuelan businesspeople